Magnanimous Records is an independent record label based in Takoma Park, Maryland. Founded in 2000, the artist-run label specializes in atmospheric and experimental music.

History 
Magnanimous Records was founded in Shepherdstown, West Virginia in 2001 by Curt Seiss and Daniele Seiss. The label was formed to provide a platform for local musicians specializing in modern atmospheric music, as most local venues catered primarily to Appalachian and bluegrass musicians. The label soon signed around a dozen ambient and atmospheric musicians, and later moved to Takoma Park, Maryland.

The label's first compilation in 2004 received a glowing review from Left off the Dial, which wrote "While indie-pop culture appropriates the IDM underground to make frequently saccharine sing-alongs, it is good to know that young, talented musicians continue to produce intelligent, experimental electronic sounds. Fans...will appreciate the drifting tones and haunted quality of the Magnanimous artists."

Roster
moljebka pvlse
Paradigm9
Aaron Lennox
Brain Ballet
Skinny
Mode7
Polyphasic
Michael Winter
LIGO
Element Kuuda
ophibre
Lykaion Eclipse
Mandible Chatter
Ourson
David Tagg

Discography

''Source: Discogs.com (updated July 31, 2013)

See also
 List of electronic music record labels

References

External links
 Magnanimous Records (Official)
Magnanimous Records on MySpace (Official)

American independent record labels
Record labels established in 2000
Experimental music record labels